Constantinovca is a commune in Edineţ district, Moldova. It is composed of two villages: Constantinovca and Iachimeni.

References

Communes of Edineț District
Former Jewish agricultural colonies of Bessarabia